Wiluszynski v London Borough of Tower Hamlets [1989] ICR 439 is a UK labour law case concerning the contract of employment. It held that if an employment was only partly performed due to a strike, this could be construed as not completing an entire obligation, so that even if an employer has received much more value, they need to pay nothing.

This case has been criticised on the ground that it fails to give adequate weight to the context of employment contracts, which differ from commercial contracts, particularly in light of developments in the law of unjust enrichment and the decision of Autoclenz Ltd v Belcher.

Facts
Mr Marek Wilusyzynski was a member of the trade union, the National and Local Government Officers Association, whose strike plan was to refuse to answer enquiries from London Borough of Tower Hamlets council members. This was only a very small proportion of his duties as a housing officer, because he dealt mainly with complaints directly from tenants. He made up three hours of work after five weeks of industrial action. Yet the council had warned that no payment would be made if work was not performed. John Hendy and Jeremy McMullen for Marek.

The first instance court said there had been substantial performance of the job, and management acquiesced in the variation.

Judgment
Nicholls LJ in the Court of Appeal held that no payment was due to the striking workers, because they had only partly performed an entire obligation of their contracts.

See also

UK labour law
Employment contract in English law
Autoclenz Ltd v Belcher
Hoenig v Isaacs

References

Further reading
British Telecommunications plc v Ticehurst [1992] ICR 383, part performance and business efficacy

External links
Miles v Wakefield Metropolitan District Council UKHL 15, 1987, AC 539

United Kingdom labour case law
Court of Appeal (England and Wales) cases
1989 in case law
1989 in British law
London Borough of Tower Hamlets
United Kingdom employment contract case law